Bien Acompañado is the fourth album by Mexican singer Reyli, released in 2011.

Track listing
 Asi es la Vida (featuring Joan Sebastian) - 4:23
 Amor del Bueno (featuring Miguel Bosé) - 4:05
 Alma Gemela (featuring Camila) - 3:44
 La Descarada (featuring Diego Torres) - 3:48
 Al Fin Me Armé De Valor (featuring Pepe Aguilar) - 3:51
 ¿Qué Nos Pasó? (featuring Yuridia) - 3:52
 Que Vueltas Da La Vida (featuring Elefante) - 3:45
 De La Noche A La Mañana (featuring Miguel Rios) - 4:38
 El Aguacero (featuring Rosana) - 4:28
 La Que Se Fue (featuring Carlos Rivera) - 4:03
 Desde Que Llegaste (featuring Rosario) - 3:38
 El Abandonao (featuring David Summers) - 4:06
 Elena (featuring La Unión) - 4:34
 Perdóname En Silencio (featuring Playa Limbo) - 4:04
 Todos Caben (featuring Presuntos Implicados) - 4:04
  Ahora Tengo (featuring Ana Bárbara) - 3:17
 Saltare Al Vacio (featuring Armando Manzanero) - 3:28

Album certification

References

2011 albums
Reyli albums